Eric Morris may refer to:
 Eric Morris (actor) (born 1931), actor and acting teacher
 Eric "Monty" Morris (born c. 1942), Jamaican musician
 Eric Morris (bassist)
 Eric Morris (footballer, born 1951), Scottish football player with Rangers and Ayr United
 Eric Morris (footballer, born 1940) (1940–2011), Welsh football player with Chester City
 Eric Morris (1930s footballer), Welsh football defender
 Eric Morris (American football) (born 1985), Texas Tech assistant coach and former player
 Eric A. Morris, television writer and transportation scholar